Sophie Bessis ( , 1947) is a Tunisian-born French historian, journalist, researcher, and feminist author. She has written numerous works in French, Spanish, and English on development in the Maghreb and the Arab world, as well as the situation of women denouncing the identity imprisonment to which they are subjected. She is the recipient of the Paris Liège literary prize and was honored as Commandeur of the Order of the Republic.

A history scholar and former editor-in-chief of the weekly magazine Jeune Afrique, she is currently a research associate at the Institute for International and Strategic Relations (IRIS) in Paris and Deputy Secretary General of the International Federation of Rights Leagues (FIDH). She has taught the political economy of development at the Department of Political Science at the Sorbonne and in the Institut national des langues et civilisations orientales (INALCO). She is a consultant for UNESCO and UNICEF, has carried out numerous missions in Africa.

Biography 
Sophie Bessis was born in Tunis, in 1947. Her family was part of the Jewish upper middle class. She is the daughter of Juliette Bessis, a historian, professor and researcher who specialized in the Maghreb and was a Communist militant; and Aldo Bessis, a trade unionist member of the Union syndicale des travailleurs de Tunisie and an expert of the U.N. Food and Agriculture Organization (FAO).

Bessis moved to France in 1975 where she studied history and worked for some time as a journalist. A history specialist, she is the former editor of the weekly, Jeune Afrique. She has been professor of political economy of development in the department of political science at the Sorbonne and in INALCO. As a consultant for UNESCO and UNICEF, she has participated in numerous missions in Africa. She is the director of research at the Institute of International and Strategic Relations (IRIS) of Paris and deputy general secretary of the International Federation for Human Rights (FIDH).

Bessis is the author of numerous works including a biography of Habib Bourguiba with Souhayr Belhassen. In 2007, she published "Los árabes, las mujeres y la libertad"  ("Arabs, women and freedom") which reviews the inheritance of the Egyptian reformers of the early twentieth century, or the Bourguiba, that enacted in 1956 a law that freed the Tunisians and analyzes the changes of Arab societies and the disappointments of a badly undertaken modernization connected with the development of the Islamists and the return to an identity based solely on the religious norm.  Bessis denounces the identity imprisonment to which women are subjected to in their country and in the Arab world. In 2017, she published Les Valeureuses ou Cinq Tunisiennes dans l’Histoire, in which she vindicates the story of key women in Tunisia, namely Elissa, the founding Phoenician princess of Carthage (also known as Didon), the singer and Jewish actress Habiba Msika who in the 1920s stood out for her transgressive look, Aïcha Sayida Manoubia, the "free saint" of the thirteenth century recognized by the Sufi tradition, Aziza Othmana, legendary Tunisian-Ottoman princess of the seventeenth century, and the feminist Habiba Menchari whose conference in January 1929 against the use of the veil shocked Habib Bourguiba.

In 2017, Bessis announced the donation of her parents' library, a collection of books and newspapers on the history of Tunisia and the Maghreb, to the National Library of Tunis.

Awards 
 2015, Paris Liège literary prize for La Double impasse : l'universel à l'épreuve des fondamentalismes religieux et marchand.
 2016, Commandeur de l’Ordre de la République.

Selected works

In French 
 L’Arme alimentaire, Paris, Maspero, 1979
 La Dernière Frontière : les tiers-mondes et la tentation de l'Occident,  Paris, Jean-Claude Lattès, 1983 (notice BnF no FRBNF34725538)
 Femmes du Maghreb l'enjeu, Paris, Jean-Claude Lattès, 1983
 Habib Bourguiba : biographie en deux volumes, Paris, Jeune Afrique, 1988 ; réed. Elyzad, Tunis, 20124
 Mille et une bouches, Paris, Autrement, 1995
 L’Occident et les Autres : histoire d’une suprématie, Paris, La Découverte, 2003
 Les Arabes, les femmes, la liberté, Paris, Albin Michel, 2007
 Dedans, dehors, Tunis, Elyzad, 2010
 La Double impasse : l'universel à l'épreuve des fondamentalismes religieux et marchand, Paris, La Découverte, coll. " Cahiers libres ", 2014()
 Les Valeureuses : cinq Tunisiennes dans l'histoire, Tunis, Elyzad, 2017

In Spanish 
 Mujeres del Magreb, lo que está en juego (1994) Editorial Horas y horas
 El hambre en el mundo (1994)
 Occidente y los otros: historia de una supremacía. (2002) Alianza Editorial
 Las emergencias del mundo: economía, poder alteridad (2005) Nobel
 Los árabes, las mujeres, la libertad (2007) Alianza Editorial
 Mujer y familia en las sociedades árabes actuales. (2010) Editorial Bellaterra

In English 
 Equal inheritance for daughters is key to Tunisian women's empowerment
 Western Supremacy: The Triumph of an Idea? Zed Books, 2003

See also 
 Bochra Belhaj Hmida

References

External links 
 Página de Sophie Bessis en IRIS (French)
 Conferencia clausura curso teoría feminista Centro de Estudios de Género y Feministas (Spanish)

20th-century Tunisian historians
Women historians
Tunisian feminists
21st-century Tunisian historians
People from Tunis
20th-century Tunisian women writers
21st-century Tunisian women writers
Tunisian Jews
Women's studies academics
International Federation for Human Rights
1947 births
Living people
Tunisian emigrants to France